Neil Conrad Parrott (born July 30, 1970) is an American politician who previously represented District 2A, which includes Hagerstown and Sharpsburg, as a Republican in the Maryland House of Delegates. Parrott ran for the United States House of Representatives as a Republican in 2020 and 2022 in Maryland's 6th congressional district, losing both times to incumbent Democrat David Trone.

Background

Born in Bethesda, Maryland, Parrott graduated from Old Mill High School in 1988. He went on to the University of Maryland, College Park where he graduated with a Bachelor of Science degree in civil engineering in 1994. He later attended graduate school and in 2006 graduated from Mount Saint Mary's University with a Master of Business Administration.

Parrott began his career at the Maryland State Highway Administration where he was a traffic engineer. He went on from there to become the Deputy Director of Engineering in the Frederick, Maryland Department of Public Works.

In the legislature

Parrott was sworn in as a member of the Maryland House of Delegates in January 2011, representing District 2B. He was assigned to the House Judiciary Committee.

Due to the state's legislative redistricting passed in 2012, but not taking effect until after the 2014 general elections, District 2B and District 2A were combined to create one district. This created a two-at-large member district, District 2A. After winning re-election in his new district in 2014, Parrott continued to serve on the House Judiciary Committee.

Referendum 
In 2012, Parrott founded an organization, MDPetitions.com, to coordinate petitioning laws he opposes to be placed on ballot initiatives.

That year, his organization was successful in putting three laws on the ballot for repeal – same-sex marriage, in-state tuition for undocumented immigrants, and a proposed congressional redistricting map – but all three were upheld by Maryland voters.

Two later petition attempts by the organization – a 2013 bill abolishing the death penalty in Maryland, and a 2014 bill regarding certain protections for transgender Marylanders, nicknamed "the Bathroom Bill" by its detractors – fell short of the threshold to get on the ballot.

2020 presidential election

Following the 2020 United States presidential election, Parrott traveled to Pennsylvania to observe ballots being counted. Following the 2021 U.S. Capitol attack, Parrott said the majority of attendees at the preceding rally "were simply there to support fair elections," and were unaware "that some people were going to try to take over the rally and make it violent."

Electoral history
 2010 general election for Maryland House of Delegates – District 2B
Voters to choose one:
{| class="wikitable"
|-
!Name
!Votes
!Percent
!Outcome
|-
|-
|Neil C. Parrott, Rep.
|align=right|7,663
|align=right|61.78%
|align=center|Won
|-
|-
|Brien J. Poffenberger
|align=right|4,718
|align=right|38.04%
|align=center|Lost
|-
|-
|Write-in candidates
|align=right|22
|align=right|0.18%
|align=center|Lost
|}
 2014 primary for Maryland House of Delegates – District 2A
Voters to choose two:
{| class="wikitable"
|-
! Name !! Votes !! Percent !! Outcome
|-
| Neil Parrott
|align=right| 5,362
|align=right| 45.8%
|align=center|Won
|-
| Andrew Serafini
|align=right| 5,178
|align=right| 44.2%
|align=center| Won
|-
| David Hanlin
|align=right| 1,180
|align=right| 10.1%
|align=center| Lost
|}

 2014 general election for Maryland House of Delegates – District 2A
Voters to choose two:
{| class="wikitable"
|-
! Name!! Votes !! Percent!! Outcome
|-
| Neil Parrott
|align=right| 17,599
|align=right| 36.0%
|align=center| Won
|-
| Andrew Serafini
|align=right| 17,528
|align=right| 35.9%
|align=center| Won
|-
| Elizabeth Paul
|align=right| 8,279
|align=right| 16.9%
|align=center| Lost
|-
| Charles Bailey
|align=right| 5,419
|align=right| 11.1%
|align=center| Lost
|-
| Write-in candidates
|align=right| 22
|align=right| 0.0%
|align=center| Lost
|}

References

External links
 NeilParrottForDelegate campaign web site
 Delegate Neil Parrott official web site

1970 births
21st-century American politicians
Candidates in the 2022 United States House of Representatives elections
Living people
Republican Party members of the Maryland House of Delegates